The 2012 Americas Rugby Championship season was the third season of the Americas Rugby Championship. It took place between 12 and 20 October 2012 in Langford, British Columbia. The tournament featured the same teams as in the 2010 version, Argentina Jaguars, Canada Selects, USA Selects, with the exception of Uruguay who replaced Tonga A. The Argentina Jaguars won the tournament going undefeated in three matches.

Teams

 
 
  USA Selects

Table

Schedule

All times are in PDT (UTC−7).

References

External links
 Official Website

2012
International rugby union competitions hosted by Canada
2012 rugby union tournaments for national teams
2012 in Canadian rugby union
2012 in American rugby union
2012 in Argentine rugby union
rugby union
2012 in North American rugby union
2012 in South American rugby union
October 2012 sports events in Canada